The 1987 Western Kentucky Hilltoppers football team represented Western Kentucky University as an independent during the 1987 NCAA Division I-AA football season. Led by fourth-year head coach Dave Roberts, the Hilltoppers compiled a 7–4. The team earned the school's first NCAA Division I-AA Football Championship playoff berth; their previous playoff appearances had been at the NCAA Division II level. Western Kentucky played their home games at L. T. Smith Stadium in Bowling Green, Kentucky. Lights were installed prior to the season, and Western Kentucky hosted their first night game on September 19, a victory over rival . The Hilltoppers finished the season ranked No. 11 in final NCAA Division I-AA Football Committee poll.
Western Kentucky’s roster included future National Football League (NFL) players Tony Brown, Malcolm Darden, James Edwards, Glenn Holt, David Smith, Steve Walsh, Harold Wright, Xavier Jordan, and Dean Tiebout.  Edwards, Walsh, and Dewayne Penn were named to the AP All American team.

Schedule

References

Western Kentucky
Western Kentucky Hilltoppers football seasons
Western Kentucky Hilltoppers football